Funnelsort is a comparison-based sorting algorithm. It is similar to mergesort, but it is a cache-oblivious algorithm, designed for a setting where the number of elements to sort is too large to fit in a cache where operations are done. It was introduced by Matteo Frigo, Charles Leiserson, Harald Prokop, and Sridhar Ramachandran in 1999 in the context of the cache oblivious model.

Mathematical properties 

This number of memory transfers has been shown to be asymptotically optimal for comparison sorts.

Algorithm

Basic overview 
Funnelsort operates on a contiguous array of  elements. To sort the elements, it performs the following:

 Split the input into  arrays of size , and sort the arrays recursively.
 Merge the  sorted sequences using a -merger. (This process will be described in more detail.)

Funnelsort is similar to merge sort in that some number of subarrays are recursively sorted, after which a merging step combines the subarrays into one sorted array. Merging is performed by a device called a k-merger, which is described in the section below.

k-mergers 
A k-merger takes  sorted sequences. Upon one invocation of a k-merger, it outputs the first  elements of the sorted sequence obtained by merging the k input sequences.

At the top level, funnelsort uses a -merger on  sequences of length , and invokes this merger once.

The k-merger is built recursively out of -mergers. It consists of  input -mergers , and a single output -merger .
The k inputs are separated into  sets of  inputs each. Each of these sets is an input to one of the input mergers. The output of each input merger is connected to a buffer, a FIFO queue that can hold  elements. The buffers are implemented as circular queues.
The outputs of the  buffers are connected to the inputs of the output merger .

In this construction, any input merger only outputs  items at once, but the buffer it outputs to has double the space. This is done so that an input merger can be called only when its buffer does not have enough items, but that when it is called, it outputs a lot of items at once (namely,  of them).

A k-merger works recursively in the following way. To output  elements, it recursively invokes its output merger  times. To fill the i-th buffer, it recursively invokes the corresponding input merger  once. If this cannot be done (due to the merger running out of inputs), this step is skipped. Since this call outputs  elements, the buffer contains at least  elements. At the end of all these operations, the k-merger has output the first  of its input elements, in sorted order.

Analysis 
Most of the analysis of this algorithm revolves around analyzing the space and cache miss complexity of the k-merger.

The first important bound is that a k-merger can be fit in  space. To see this, we let  denote the space needed for a k-merger. To fit the  buffers of size  takes  space. To fit the  smaller buffers takes  space. Thus, the space satisfies the recurrence . This recurrence has solution .

It follows that there is a positive constant  such that a problem of size at most  fits entirely in cache, meaning that it incurs no additional cache misses.

Letting  denote the number of cache misses incurred by a call to a k-merger, one can show that  This is done by an induction argument. It has  as a base case. For larger k, we can bound the number of times a -merger is called. The output merger is called exactly  times. The total number of calls on input mergers is at most . This gives a total bound of  recursive calls. In addition, the algorithm checks every buffer to see if needs to be filled. This is done on  buffers every step for  steps, leading to a max of  cache misses for all the checks.

This leads to the recurrence , which can be shown to have the solution given above.

Finally, the total cache misses  for the entire sort can be analyzed. It satisfies the recurrence  This can be shown to have solution

Lazy funnelsort 
Lazy funnelsort is a modification of the funnelsort, introduced by Gerth Stølting Brodal and Rolf Fagerberg in 2002.
The modification is that when a merger is invoked, it does not have to fill each of its buffers. Instead, it lazily fills a buffer only when it is empty. This modification has the same asymptotic runtime and memory transfers as the original funnelsort, but has applications in cache-oblivious algorithms for problems in computational geometry in a method known as distribution sweeping.

See also 
 Cache-oblivious algorithm
 Cache-oblivious distribution sort
 External sorting

References 

Sorting algorithms
Comparison sorts
External memory algorithms
Analysis of algorithms
Cache (computing)
Models of computation